Fox Creek is a stream in Pike County in the U.S. state of Missouri. It is a tributary of the Mississippi River.

Fox Creek was so named on account of foxes in the area.

See also
List of rivers of Missouri

References

Rivers of Pike County, Missouri
Rivers of Missouri